Senator Sommer may refer to:

Jacob Sommer (1758–1827), Pennsylvania State Senate
Roger Sommer (politician) (born 1943), Illinois State Senate

See also
Heather Somers (born 1966), Connecticut State Senate
Senator Summers (disambiguation)